Gelechia picrogramma is a moth of the family Gelechiidae. It was described by Edward Meyrick in 1929. It is found in Guyana and Amazonas, Brazil.

References

Moths described in 1929
Gelechia